= Soomaya Javadi =

Hazara human rights activist

- Occupation: Human rights activist

Soomaya Javadi is a Hazara human rights activist who fled Afghanistan following the fall of Kabul in 2021 with the aid of the 30 Birds Foundation, and settled in Saskatoon, Canada. Citing the extreme prejudice both women and ethnic minorities such as the Hazara face in Afghanistan, she is committed to promoting women’s rights and minority rights in her home country through activism and education.
